The Grand Orient of Italy (GOI) is an Italian masonic grand lodge founded in 1805; the viceroy Eugene of Beauharnais was instrumental in its establishment. Its current Grand Master is Italian journalist Stefano Bisi.

 the Grand Orient had 22,675 members in 842 lodges, a significant growth over the preceding three-year period. 

The international influence of the Grand Orient has decreased since it lost the official recognition of the "Home Grand Lodges" (of England, Ireland, and Scotland) owing to alleged corruption, although it remains regular in government and practice.

History
The Grand Orient of Italy was founded in 1805, during the Napoleonic Kingdom of Italy; the viceroy Eugene of Beauharnais was instrumental in its establishment.

Past Grand Masters have included:
Giuseppe Garibaldi,
Adriano Lemmi, 1885–96
Sculptor Ettore Ferrari,
Mayor of Rome Ernesto Nathan

Freemasonry was suppressed by Mussolini in 1925, being restarted after the Second World War. Nevertheless, many people connected with the Italians Fascism were Freemasons: Edmondo Rossoni, Araldo di Crollalanza, Alfredo De Marsico, Peppino Caradonna, Bernardo Barbiellini Amidei, Aldo Finzi, Balbino Giuliano e Costanzo Ciano, father of Galeazzo, Alberto Beneduce, Giacomo Acerbo, Ezio Maria Gray, and Armando Casalini, among others.

Regularity
Recognition by the United Grand Lodge of England (UGLE) is a key factor in maintaining the status of a Regular Masonic jurisdiction. The Grand Orient of Italy was once a significant player within international Freemasonry, and in 1972 it was recognised as regular by UGLE. However, this recognition was withdrawn in 1993, due to accusations of corruption and Mafia involvement. For thirty years, the Regular Grand Lodge of Italy was the only Italian Grand Lodge recognised by UGLE, or the other home constitutions of Ireland and Scotland. However, the Grand Orient continued to be recognised by a large majority of the other regular masonic jurisdictions, both in Europe and worldwide.

This situation was highly unusual, in that most regular authorities recognised the Grand Orient, but its status was complicated by the lack of recognition from the three most senior jurisdictions, which normally give a lead in terms of international recognition. To further complicate the situation, the United Grand Lodge of England publicly stated that the Grand Orient of Italy was regular in both origins and practices, but that it must (at that time) remain unrecognised due to the issues surrounding alleged corruption.

However, this position was rectified in March 2023, when the United Grand Lodge of England agreed to re-recognise the Grand Orient of Italy alongside the Regular Grand Lodge of Italy.

Propaganda Due, the lodge that investigative journalists have identified as being implicated in the murder of Roberto Calvi, was originally chartered by the Grand Orient, although the Grand Orient revoked its charter in 1974.

List of Grand Masters
Prior to Gustavo Raffi's grand mastership two terms of five years was the maximum tenure for a grand master. This, however was changed during Raffi's time, and his three-term grand mastership which began in 1999 ended in 2014.

References

Bibliography
Enrico Simoni, Bibliografia della Massoneria in Italia, Foggia, Edizioni Bastogi, 1° volume 1992 (3471 schede), 2° volume 1993 (indici sistematici degli articoli delle Riviste massoniche del dopoguerra; 3762 schede), 1° volume di aggiornamento 1997 (schede da 3472 a 4584), 3° volume 2006 (indici sistematici degli articoli della "Rivista della Massoneria Italiana" e della "Rivista Massonica"; 1870–1926; 6478 schede), 2° volume di aggiornamento 2010 (schede da 4585 a 6648)

External links
Official Homepage
Official Facebook
Official Twitter

1805 establishments in Italy
Freemasonry in Italy
Ital
1805 establishments in the Kingdom of Italy (Napoleonic)